German submarine U-1222 was a Type IXC/40 U-boat built for Nazi Germany's Kriegsmarine during World War II.

Design
German Type IXC/40 submarines were slightly larger than the original Type IXCs. U-1222 had a displacement of  when at the surface and  while submerged. She had two shafts and two  propellers.

U-1222 was fitted with six  torpedo tubes (four fitted at the bow and two at the stern), 22 torpedoes, one  SK C/32 naval gun, 180 rounds, and a  Flak M42 as well as two twin  C/30 anti-aircraft guns. The boat had a complement of forty-eight.

Service history
U-1222 was ordered on 25 August 1941 from Deutsche Werft in Hamburg-Finkenwerder under the yard number 385. Her keel was laid down on 2 November 1942 and was launched the following year on 9 June 1943. About three months later she was commissioned into service on 1 September 1943 under the command of Kapitänleutnant Heinz Bielfeld (Crew 34) in the 4th U-boat Flotilla.

After work-up for deployment, U-1222 transferred to the 10th U-boat Flotilla and left Kiel for the West Atlantic on 13 April 1944 for her first and only patrol. Stopping briefly in Marvik, Norway, for replenishment, she operated with no success south of Nova Scotia.

Returning from patrol, U-1222 was charging her batteries while submerged, when her snorkel was spotted by a British aircraft, Sunderland 'P' of No. 201 Squadron RAF, on 11 July 1944 off La Rochelle. The aircraft immediately attacked the U-boat with depth charges and sank her. All 56 crew members died in the event.

References

Bibliography

World War II submarines of Germany
German Type IX submarines
1943 ships
U-boats commissioned in 1943
Ships built in Hamburg
U-boats sunk in 1944
U-boats sunk by British aircraft
U-boats sunk by depth charges
Ships lost with all hands
Maritime incidents in July 1944